AvWest is a charter airline and fixed-base operator (FBO) based at Perth Jet Centre in Perth, Australia since 2002.

Operations
AvWest operates from the Perth Jet Centre, which the company owns at the Perth Airport. The airline operates mainly in Australia and can fly to international locations.

Fleet
Current fleet:
 2 Bombardier Global Express
 1 AgustaWestland AW109
 2 Bombardier Challenger 604
 1 Cessna CE208
 1 De Havilland Canada DHC-6-400 Twin Otter

4 Bombardier Global 7000 and 2 Bombardier Global 8000 jets are on order.

Former fleet:

 G-IVSP Gulfstream Corporate Jet - 1
 Hawker 800 - 1

See also

List of airlines of Australia

References

External links
AvWest

Airlines established in 2002
Australian companies established in 2002
Airlines of Australia
Airlines of Western Australia
Companies based in Perth, Western Australia